Ghuwayr Abu Shusha was a Palestinian Arab village in the Tiberias Subdistrict. It was depopulated during the 1947–1948 Civil War in Mandatory Palestine on April 21, 1948. It was located 8 km north of Tiberias, nearby Wadi Rubadiyya.

History
In 1838 Edward Robinson found on the remains of a few dwellings, built of rough volcanic  stones, some of which were still used as magazines by the Arabs of the plain. A wely with a white dome marked the spot. He found  no traces of antiquity.

In 1850-1851 de Saulcy saw the village, which he described as ruined. Of the village, all which remained was a few portions of wall of modern appearance, "but in the midst of these is still standing a square vaulted tower, constructed in fine blocks of Herodian workmanship, or Roman of the early empire. This tower rests against a wall of more recent character."

In 1875 Victor Guérin  visited and noted the little wely dedicated to Abou-Choutheh.

In 1881, the PEF's Survey of Western Palestine (SWP) described  it as containing 20 Moslems, with housed built of basalt, located round a mill. There were modern ruins in the village, and a number of ruined mills in the valley below.

British mandate era
In  the  1945 statistics it had a population of 1,240 Muslims, with 8,609 dunams of land. Of this,   21 dunams were used for citrus  and bananas, 1,377  for plantations and irrigable land, 1,848 dunams for cereals, while 6 dunams were classified as built-up (urban) area.

Ruins of watermills could be seen at the nearby Khirbat Abu Shusha.

1948, and aftermath
The village was depopulated after a military assault on 21 and 28 April 1948.

Ginosar presently occupy part of what was village land, so does Livnim, established in 1982 ca. 1 km northwest of the  Ghuwayr Abu Shusha site.

In 1992  the village site was described: "The village site is covered with thorns and wild vegetation, including Christ's-thorn trees and cactuses. The shrine of Shaykh Muhammad and the remains of a mill can be seen among piles of stones and a few olive trees. The lower-lying lands are planted in bananas and citrus, while the highlands are used as grazing areas by the Israelis."

Gallery

References

Bibliography

External links
Welcome To Ghuwayr Abu Shusha
 Ghuwayr Abu Shusha, Zochrot
Survey of Western Palestine, Map 6: IAA, Wikimedia commons

Arab villages depopulated during the 1948 Arab–Israeli War
District of Tiberias